Beau MacMillan is an American chef and television personality. He is the executive chef for Sanctuary on Camelback Mountain, an upscale resort in Arizona, and its featured restaurant, elements.  He is also known by his nickname, "BeauMac."

Career
At 16 years old, MacMillan started working at Crane Brook Tea Room in Carver.  He worked under Chef Francois de Melogue for a year. He went on La Vieille Maison in Boca Raton, Florida, eventually promoted to sous chef.

MacMillan moved to Los Angeles to become sous chef at Hotel Bel-Air.  He was later hired at Shutters on the Beach in Santa Monica. In 1998, he was hired as the Executive Chef at the Sanctuary on Camelback Mountain (formerly known as The Ranch on Camelback). In March 2001, MacMillan and former Executive Chef Charles Wiley opened the restaurant elements.

Television career
While MacMillan was handing out hors d'oeuvres at the Aspen Food & Wine festival in 2005, Food Network's senior vice president of program planning, Bruce Seidel, approached him. Seidel had visited MacMillan at elements and invited him to take a turn on Iron Chef America, where he eventually beat Bobby Flay in "Battle American Kobe Beef."

In early 2010, MacMillan co-hosted Season 1 of Food Network's Worst Cooks in America with Anne Burrell, and in August 2012, he joined the pro team on Beat the Chefs on the Game Show Network.

In 2011, he participated in The Next Iron Chef and was eliminated from the competition in the fourth episode.

He also was on Guy's Grocery Games as a judge and a chef who won $16,000 for his favorite charity, St. Mary's Food Truck.

References

American television chefs
American male chefs
Food Network chefs
Living people
People from Plymouth, Massachusetts
People from Scottsdale, Arizona
1971 births